The Almanac is a weekly California newspaper published to about 15,000 readers across Menlo Park, Atherton, Portola Valley and Woodside. The paper was founded in 1965 by Jean Heflin, Betty Fry and Hedy Boissevain; it was originally titled The Country Almanac.  Embarcadero Pub. Co. bought the Almanac in 1993. The editor is Renee Batti.

Awards and recognition 
In 1995 The Country Almanac of Menlo Park was awarded for general excellence by the California Newspapers Publishers Association. The mayor of the City of Menlo Park honored Tom Gibboney, the paper's publisher and editor for 21 years, for multiple accomplishments on his retirement from the paper in 2014.

References

External links 
 Almanac website

Weekly newspapers published in California
San Mateo County, California
Newspapers established in 1965
Newspapers published in the San Francisco Bay Area
1965 establishments in California